IRIB TV3 ( or ; Shabake Se) is one of the 32 national television channels in Iran.

It is the third television channel created by the Islamic Republic of Iran Broadcasting, and started broadcasting on December 4, 1993. The channel is often referred to as the youth channel, due to its large amounts of programming dedicated to sports. The channel broadcasts major Iranian sport events, mini-series, comedies, and movies (both foreign and domestic).On 7 August 2016, the TV3 network HD broadcast trial began in Tehran and provincial capitals .

Programs
Programs in this channel mainly produce in 6 types:
Entertainment
Movie and Series
Political
Scientific
Social and Economical
Sport
Cinema

Popular programs

Programs that are currently broadcasting
Football-e Bartar (2001–)
Gozareshe Varzeshi (2002–)
Samte Khoda (2009–)
Seven (2010—)
New Era (2019–)

Programs that have finished broadcasting
Mardan Ahanin (1998–2018)
Navad (1999–2019)
After the Rain (2000)
Khat-e Ghermez (2001)
Zir-e Asmane Shahr 1 (2001)
Zir-e Asmane Shahr 2 (2002)
Noghtechin (2004)
Tabe Sard (2004)
Khane Be Doosh (2004)
Shabhaye Barareh (2005–2006)
Motaham Gorikht (2005)
Nargess (2006)
Zire Zamin (2006)
Baghe Mozaffar (2006–2007)
Mah-e Asal (2007–2018)
Rahe Bipayan (2007)
Char Khooneh (2007)
Sweet and Sour (2007)
Emperor of the Sea (2007–2008)
Halgheye Sabz (2007–2008)
Marde Hezar Chehreh (2008)
Bezangah (2009)
Marde Do Hezar Chehreh (2009)
Jumong (2008–2009)
Sherlock (2010–2019)
The Kingdom of the Winds (2010–2011)
The Return of Iljimae (2011)
Dong Yi (2012)
Dozd va Police (2012)
Bist Chahardah (2014)
Kim Su-ro, The Iron King (2014)
Three Stars (2014–2017)
Moon Embracing the Sun (2015)
Orange Spring (2015–2018)
Hala Khorshid (2016–2019)
 Wall to Wall (2017)
Be Winner (2018–2019)
Bist Hejdah (2018)
Shab Aram (2018–2019)
The Event (2020)
The Last Wire (2020–2022)

References

External links

Television stations in Iran
Persian-language television stations
Islamic Republic of Iran Broadcasting
Television channels and stations established in 1993